Emergency Hospital is a 1956 American drama film directed by Lee Sholem and written by Don Martin. The film stars Walter Reed, Margaret Lindsay, John Archer, Byron Palmer, Rita Johnson and Peg La Centra. The film was released on November 2, 1956 by United Artists.

Plot

Cast 
Walter Reed as Police Sgt. Paul Arnold
Margaret Lindsay as Dr. Janet Carey
John Archer as Dr. Herb Ellis
Byron Palmer as Ben Caldwell
Rita Johnson as Head Nurse Norma Mullin
Peg La Centra as Nurse Fran Richards
Robert Keys as Police Officer Mike Flaherty
Rhodes Reason as Juvenile Officer Ross

References

External links 
 

1956 films
United Artists films
American drama films
1956 drama films
Films directed by Lee Sholem
Films scored by Paul Dunlap
1950s English-language films
1950s American films
American black-and-white films